Railway stations in Uruguay include:

Stations

Existing 

 Montevideo - national capital and port
 Lorenzo Carnelli
 Canelones
 Rodriguez
 Mal Abrigo - junction
 Colonia del Sacramento

 Mal Abrigo
 Fray Bentos - railhead near Argentina border.

Proposed 

 2010 Proposed bridge connecting with Argentina, and then to Chile via a new base tunnel.
  Department of Colonia
  Province of Entre Ríos

See also 

 Rail transport in Uruguay
 Transport in Uruguay

References

External links 

 
Railway stations
Railway stations